German submarine U-683 was a Type VIIC U-boat of Nazi Germany's Kriegsmarine during World War II. The submarine was laid down on 23 December 1942 at the Howaldtswerke yard at Hamburg, launched on 7 March 1944, and commissioned on 30 May 1944 under the command of Oberleutnant zur See Günter Keller.

Attached to 31st U-boat Flotilla based at Wesermünde, U-683 completed her training period on 31 December 1944 and was assigned to front-line service.

Design
German Type VIIC submarines were preceded by the shorter Type VIIB submarines. U-683 had a displacement of  when at the surface and  while submerged. She had two shafts and two  propellers.

U-683 was fitted with five  torpedo tubes (four fitted at the bow and one at the stern), fourteen torpedoes, one  SK C/35 naval gun, (220 rounds), one  Flak M42 and two twin  C/30 anti-aircraft guns. The boat had a complement of between forty-four and sixty.

Service history

On the first and final war patrol, U-683 was last heard from on 20 February 1945 en route to the assigned patrol area off Cherbourg. The U-boat was declared missing on 3 April 1945.

Previously recorded fate
The U-683 was recorded missing on 12 March 1945 after it was sunk in the English Channel the same day by depth charges from British frigate HMS Loch Ruthven and British sloop HMS Wild Goose. This attack was probably against the wreck of U-247.

References

Bibliography

External links

German Type VIIC submarines
1944 ships
Ships built in Hamburg
U-boats commissioned in 1944
U-boats sunk in 1945
Maritime incidents in February 1945
Missing U-boats of World War II
Ships lost with all hands
World War II shipwrecks in the English Channel
U-boats sunk by British warships
U-boats sunk by depth charges
World War II submarines of Germany